Benevello is a comune (municipality) in the Province of Cuneo in the Italian region Piedmont, located about  southeast of Turin and about  northeast of Cuneo.

Benevello borders the following municipalities: Alba, Borgomale, Diano d'Alba, Lequio Berria, and Rodello.

Demographic evolution

References 

Cities and towns in Piedmont